Bossiaea praetermissa is a species of flowering plant in the family Fabaceae and is endemic to near-coastal areas in the far south-west of Western Australia. It is a shrub with many flattened, winged cladodes and deep yellow and reddish or maroon flowers.

Description
Flowering occurs from September to November.<ref name="Muelleria2">{{cite journal |last1=Ross |first1=James H. |title=A conspectus of the Western Australian Bossiaea species (Bossiaeeae: Fabaceae). Muelleria 23: |journal=Muelleria |date=2006 |volume=11 |pages=110–115 |url=https://www.biodiversitylibrary.org/item/278250#page/112/mode/1up |access-date=21 August 2021}}</ref>

Taxonomy and namingBossiaea praetermissa was first formally described in 1994 by James Henderson Ross in the journal Muelleria from specimens collected by Margaret Corrick near Middleton Beach area in 1985. The specific epithet (praetermissa) means "overlooked" or "neglected", because the species seems to have been overlooked since first collected in 1838.

Distribution and habitat
This bossiaea usually grows in sandy soil in coastal heath and is found from near Yallingup to Mount Arid in Cape Arid National Park.

Conservation statusBossiaea praetermissa'' is classified as "not threatened" by the Western Australian Government Department of Parks and Wildlife.

References

praetermissa
Mirbelioids
Flora of Western Australia
Plants described in 1994